The Jewish Year Book is an almanac targeted at the Jewish community in the United Kingdom. It has been published every year since 1896 and is currently published by Vallentine Mitchell in association with The Jewish Chronicle and is edited by Stephen W. Massil.

It provides a directory and guide to Jewish institutions and religious, social, educational, cultural and welfare organisations in the British Isles. It also includes up to date lists of websites and a guide to worldwide Jewish organisations, and a list of Israel's embassies and missions. It gives an outline of Jewish history in Britain and covers UK laws which are relevant to Jews and their place in British society. It also includes details on notable Jewish people, obituaries, major events, fasts, festivals and a calendar. It is updated annually.

An appendix lists all Jews who currently hold various positions and honours, and a complete list of every Jew who has ever won the Victoria Cross or George Cross.

External links
Website of the publisher
Website of the Jewish Chronicle

Almanacs
Jewish media
Jews and Judaism in the United Kingdom
1896 non-fiction books
1896 establishments in the United Kingdom
Publications established in 1896
Annual events in the United Kingdom
British books